Namak Talkeh-ye Rashnow (also known as Rashnoodi, Rashnū, and Rashnūdī) is a village in Hoseyniyeh Rural District, Alvar-e Garmsiri District, Andimeshk County, Khuzestan Province, Iran. At the 2006 census, its population was 224, in 48 families.

References 

Populated places in Andimeshk County